Meridiana flew to the following destinations (as of February 2018).

List

References

Lists of airline destinations
AQA Holding S.p.A.